

Hans Kreysing (17 August 1890 – 14 April 1969) was a German general who commanded the 3rd Mountain Division and the 8th Army. He was a recipient of the  Knight's Cross of the Iron Cross with Oak Leaves and Swords.

Life and career
Hans Kreysing was born in Göttingen in Lower Saxony on 17 August 1890. He entered the German Army in October 1909, later joining a Jäger battalion. After service in World War I he remained in the army, and at the outbreak of World War II was in command of the 16th Infantry Regiment. From October 1940 to August 1943 he commanded the 3rd Mountain Division, serving in Norway, Lapland and the Eastern Front. Continuing on the Eastern Front, Kreysing led the XVII Army Corps from November 1943 to April 1944, when he took command of the 8th Army, which surrendered to Allied troops in Austria in May 1945. 

Kreysing ended the war with the rank of General of Mountain Troops.

Awards 
 Clasp to the Iron Cross (1939) II. and I. Class (24 November 1939)
 Knight's Cross of the Iron Cross with Oak Leaves and Swords
 Knight's Cross on 29 May 1940 as Oberst (Colonel) and commander of Infanterie-Regiment 16
 183rd Oak Leaves on 20 January 1943 as Generalleutnant and commander of the 3. Gebirgs-Division
 63rd Swords on 13 April 1944 as General der Gebirgstruppe and commanding general of the XVII. Armeekorps

References

Citations

Bibliography

 
 
 

1890 births
1969 deaths
People from Göttingen
People from the Province of Hanover
Generals of Mountain Troops
German Army personnel of World War I
Recipients of the Knight's Cross of the Iron Cross with Oak Leaves and Swords
Recipients of the Order of the Cross of Liberty, 1st Class
Reichswehr personnel
Prussian Army personnel
Recipients of the clasp to the Iron Cross, 1st class
Military personnel from Lower Saxony